Hawkinsville is a city in and the county seat of Pulaski County, Georgia, United States. The population was 4,589 at the 2010 census.

Hawkinsville is known as the "Harness Horse Capital" of Georgia. The Lawrence Bennett Harness Horse Racing facility is owned by the city and serves as an important training ground during winter months. The Harness Festival takes place every April at the end of training before horses head north for the harness racing season.

History

Hawkinsville was founded in 1830. In 1837, the seat of Pulaski County was transferred to Hawkinsville from Hartford. The community was named for Benjamin Hawkins, delegate to the Continental Congress, and the United States Indian Agent in the Southeast, appointed by President George Washington.

The city includes Hawkinsville High School and several historical sites, including Hawkinsville City Hall-Auditorium, Hawkinsville Public School, the Merritt-Ragan House, the Pulaski County Courthouse, and Taylor Hall. St. Thomas African Methodist Episcopal Church was organized after the American Civil War as one of hundreds of AME churches planted in the South by missionaries from the first black independent denomination in the United States, founded in the early 19th century in Philadelphia, Pennsylvania. The Hawkinsville Commercial and Industrial Historic District is listed on the National Register of Historic Places. Hawkinsville is also home to the historic Hawkinsville Opera House.

Geography
Many highways converge in the city. U.S. Routes 129 and 341 are the two main highways through town, and run through the downtown area together. Upon leaving the city, U.S. 341 leads northwest 21 mi (34 km) to Perry along Interstate 75 and southeast 20 mi (32 km) to Eastman. U.S. 129 follows the route of U.S. 341 north of the city, but splits off northwest of downtown, leading north 28 mi (45 km) to Warner Robins. South of downtown, U.S. 129 leads south 24 mi (39 km) to Abbeville. In addition, an alternate route of U.S. 129 connects the city to Cochran, 11 mi (18 km) to the northeast. Other highways that run through the city include Georgia State Routes 26, 27, 230, and 257. 

Climate
Hawkinsville has a humid subtropical climate (Köppen climate classification Cfa), with mild winters and hot, humid summers.

Demographics

2020 census

As of the 2020 United States Census, there were 3,980 people, 1,304 households, and 812 families residing in the city.

2010 census
As of the census of 2010, there were 4,589 people, 3,485 households, and 3,062 families residing in the city. The racial makeup of the city was 48.32% White, 49.15% African American, 0.40% Native American, 0.73% Asian, 0.37% Pacific Islander, 0.37% from other races, and 0.67% from two or more races. Hispanic or Latino of any race were 1.19% of the population.

There were 3,485 households, out of which 28.1% had children under the age of 18 living with them, 38.6% were married couples living together, 21.5% had a female householder with no husband present, and 36.3% were non-families. 33.7% of all households were made up of individuals, and 17.5% had someone living alone who was 65 years of age or older.  The average household size was 2.39 and the average family size was 3.06.

In the city, the population was spread out, with 26.2% under the age of 18, 9.2% from 18 to 24, 24.9% from 25 to 44, 23.2% from 45 to 64, and 16.5% who were 65 years of age or older.  The median age was 37 years. For every 100 females, there were 81.9 males.  For every 100 females age 18 and over, there were 73.5 males.

The median income for a household in the city was $28,977, and the median income for a family was $32,926. Males had a median income of $28,750 versus $19,628 for females. The per capita income for the city was $16,670.  About 19.7% of families and 20.6% of the population were below the poverty line, including 18.8% of those under age 18 and 27.2% of those age 65 or over.

Education

Pulaski County School District 
The Pulaski County School District holds grades pre-school to grade twelve. It consists of one elementary school, a middle school, and a high school. The district has 122 full-time teachers and over 1,632 students.
Pulaski County Elementary School
Pulaski County Middle School
Hawkinsville High School

Industry 

The Georgia Department of Corrections operates the Pulaski State Prison in Hawkinsville.

The United States Postal Service operates the Hawkinsville Post Office.

The United States Air Force operates the Hawkinsville Air Force Space Surveillance System.

Notable people
 Exxon Valdez Captain Joseph Hazelwood was born in Hawkinsville.
Charles Johnson, former defensive end for the Carolina Panthers, was born in Hawkinsville.
Young Jeezy (Musician and Businessman) was born in Columbia, South Carolina but was raised in Hawkinsville.

References

External links

 Hawkinsville Chamber of Commerce

Cities in Georgia (U.S. state)
Cities in Pulaski County, Georgia
County seats in Georgia (U.S. state)
1830 establishments in Georgia (U.S. state)